Allorhynchium quadrimaculatum is a species of wasp in the family Vespidae.
This wasp is capable of a sting that has been described by natives of Australia and South America as "More painful than death"

References

Potter wasps